Bacteriocinogens, also known as bacteriocinogenic plasmids, are bacterial plasmids that direct the synthesis of bacteriocins, bacteriocidal proteins produced by certain types of bacteria that kill other strains of the same species or closely related species. Normally the bacteriocinogen is repressed and doesn't express bacteriocin, but under certain conditions the plasmid is derepressed in a complex and poorly understood manner.

References

Plasmids